A bunker is a defensive military fortification.

Bunker and its variants may also refer to:

Places
 Bunker, Missouri, U.S.
 Bunker (Berlin), an air raid shelter in Germany
 Bunker Creek (New Hampshire), a stream in New Hampshire, U.S.
 Bunker Hill (disambiguation)

People
 Bunker (surname)
 Bunker Roy (born 1945), Indian social activist

Arts, entertainment, and media

Film and television
 The Bunker (1981 film), a film based on the 1975 book
 The Bunker (2001 film), horror film featuring Jason Flemying
 Der Bunker, a 2015 German comedy-horror film
 Bunker (2022 film), American horror film
 The Bunker (2023 film), an American film starring Tony Todd and Tobin Bell
 "The Bunker", a 2016 episode of the American television series Documentary Now!

Other arts, entertainment, and media
 Bunker (character), a DC comics superhero
 The Bunker (book), a 1975 history book about the last days of Adolf Hitler in the Führerbunker
 The Bunker (comics), a comic book published by Oni Press
 The Bunker (theatre), a fringe theatre in London 2016-2020
 The Bunker (video game), a 2016 video game
 "Bunkers", a song by The Vapors on their album New Clear Days
 Los Bunkers, Chilean alternative rock band

Government and politics
 Búnker, a faction of far-right Francoists in the period of Spanish democratic transition
 International Convention on Civil Liability for Bunker Oil Pollution Damage (BUNKER), an International treaty signed in 2001

Science and technology

Biology
 Bunker (fish) or Mossbunker, a species of fish also known as Menhaden

Transport
 Bunker fuel or Bunkers, fuel oil for maritime vessels
 Bunkering, the storage and supply of fuel oil for maritime vessels
 Fuel bunker often simply known as Bunker, the container for fuel (usually coal) on a steam tank locomotive or ship, or a chamber in a building for furnace coal
 Bunkers (energy in transport), international aviation and maritime greenhouse gas emissions are sometimes referred to as emissions from 'bunkers'

Other uses
 Bunker (golf), a depression near a green or fairway that is usually filled with sand
 Supply Depot (Toronto), a warehouse nicknamed "The Bunker"
 Führer bunker, Hitler's air raid shelter and Berlin HQ, particularly in the last months of World War II

See also